Strange Euphoria is a career-spanning box set album by Heart. The three-CD compilation features several of their hit songs as well as songs by The Lovemongers, solo songs by Ann Wilson and Nancy Wilson, a recording by the pre-Heart group Ann Wilson & The Daybreaks that goes back to 1968, and previously unreleased demos and live tracks. A DVD is also included featuring a 1976 concert at Washington State University for the Pullman, Washington-based KWSU-TV concert series The Second Ending in promotion for their debut album Dreamboat Annie.

The Amazon.com exclusive version was released with a bonus CD containing covers of five Led Zeppelin songs, entitled Heart Zeppish. As of July 2017, the bonus disc is no longer available.

Track listing

References

[https://web.archive.org/web/20120610184504/http://www.tampabay.com/blogs/80s/content/heart-releases-career-spanning-boxed-set-strange-euphoria Heart releases career-spanning boxed set 'Strange Euphoria'''], Tampa Bay Times'', June 8, 2012.

2012 compilation albums
Heart (band) compilation albums
Epic Records compilation albums
Legacy Recordings compilation albums